The second USS New England (SP-1222) was operated as a United States Navy tug in commission from 1917 to 1919. New England was built as a steel steam lighter by the Fore River Shipbuilding Company at Quincy, Massachusetts, for the New England Steamship Company of New York City.

Construction
The construction contract for the lighter intended for service in Boston harbor, but shortly after trials diverted to New Bedford, was let on 5 March 1907 and builder's trials completed in October with construction having been completed six weeks before stipulated.

The foremast was of a single Oregon pine  at the truck with a  boom served by a twin drum hoisting system, all designed for 7 ton capacity.

A  four-bladed propeller with  pitch, was driven by a direct drive engine with  cylinders with  stroke fed steam by two horizontal water tube boilers of  diameter by  length. On builder's trials the lighter made .

Built for hard service in the port the vessel had strengthened towing bitts and ice guards and a hull with three watertight bulkheads. The deck house contained rooms for the captain and mate with a galley aft. An  square hatch was located on the foredeck for access below.

In a change of plan the lighter was to see service in New Bedford rather than Boston and on her delivery voyage met severe weather that incapacitated her engine room crew with seasickness making stops at Provincetown and Woods Hole necessary. New England was to serve as a packet boat between  New Bedford and Martha's Vineyard as part of the revised duty.

Naval service
On 23 October 1917, the U.S. Navy chartered her from her owner for use during World War I. She was commissioned as USS New England on 24 October 1917 designated as SP-1222. Assigned to the 2nd Naval District in southern New England and based at Newport, Rhode Island, New England operated as a tug, aiding ships arriving at and departing from Newport and ferrying supplies for the rest of World War I and into 1919.

The Navy returned New England to the New England Steamship Company on 11 May 1919.

Notes

References

Tugs of the United States Navy
World War I auxiliary ships of the United States
Ships built in Quincy, Massachusetts
1897 ships